The Payatas landslide was a garbage dump collapse at Payatas, Quezon City, Philippines, on July 10, 2000. A large pile of garbage first collapsed and then went up in flames which resulted in the destruction of about 100 squatters' houses.

218 people were killed, according to official data, and caused 300 missing persons. Other sources, however, suggest that 705 people were killed in Payatas (Westfall, 2001) and  many first-hand accounts note the number is far greater than the official figure, perhaps closer to 1,000.

The dumping ground was immediately closed following the incident by then President Joseph Estrada but was reopened weeks later by then-Quezon City Mayor Ismael Mathay Jr. to avert an epidemic in the city due to uncollected garbage caused by the closure.

The landslide prompted the passage of Republic Act No. 9003 or the Ecological Solid Waste Management Act of 2000, which mandates the closure of open dumpsites in the Philippines by 2004 and controlled dumpsites by 2006.

In 2004, the Payatas dumpsite was reconfigured as a controlled disposal facility. but was closed in December 2010. A separate dumpsite was established near the old open dumpsite in January 2011. The newer dumpsite closed in December 2017.

See also
Bangkang papel boys survivors of the tragedy, who attempted to get the attention of Gloria Macapagal-Arroyo.

References

External links
Quezon City disaster in July, 2000

2000 disasters in the Philippines
History of Metro Manila
Landslides in 2000
Landslides in the Philippines